Mweileh  is a Syrian village located in Al-Saan Subdistrict in Salamiyah District, Hama.  According to the Syria Central Bureau of Statistics (CBS), Mweileh had a population of 225 in the 2004 census.

References 

Populated places in Salamiyah District